The 1986–87 Alpha Ethniki was the 51st season of the highest football league of Greece. The season began on 7 September 1986 and ended on 7 June 1987. Olympiacos won their 25th Greek title and their first one in four years. The championship was marked by the strike declared by 12 teams in the last three games of the championship. As a result, most of the teams did not come to the last matches of the championship and were punished by deducting 6 points. The only ones who came and were not punished were Olympiacos, Panathinaikos, OFI and Panionios, which took the first four places in the standings.

The point system was: Win: 2 points - Draw: 1 point.

League table

Results

Match changes:
All the games between the 12 teams which went on strike were counted 0–0, with both teams become a loss counted. A game between one of Olympiacos, Panathinaikos, OFI, and Panionios against the teams on strike was awarded 2–0 to the team of the first group.

Top scorers

External links
Official Greek FA Site
RSSSF
Greek SuperLeague official Site
SuperLeague Statistics

Alpha Ethniki seasons
Greece
1